Kotha Dhommata is a village panchayat in Cherial mandal in Siddipet district in the state of Telangana in India.

References

Villages in Siddipet district